Know My Name may refer to:

Songs
 "Know My Name", by  DJ Mustard from the 2016 album Cold Summer
 "Know My Name", by Djumbo from the 2005 album Jump
 "Know My Name", by Frankmusik from the 2015 album For You
 "Know My Name", by the Goo Goo Dolls from the 1990 album Hold Me Up
 "Know My Name", by Hello Demons...meet Skeletons from the 2011 EP Uncomfortable Silence
 "Know My Name", by Jamelia from the 2006 album Walk with Me
 "Know My Name", by Blake Lewis from the 2007 album A.D.D. (Audio Day Dream)
 "Know My Name", by Nightmares on Wax from the 2002 album Mind Elevation
 "Know My Name", by The Panics from the 2016 album Hole in Your Pocket
 "Know My Name", by Radamiz from the 2019 album Nothing Changes If Nothing Changes
 "Know My Name", by Rhino Bucket from the 2009 album The Hardest Town

Other uses
 Know My Name: A Memoir, a 2019 book by Chanel Miller about People v. Turner
 Know My Name, an exhibition at the National Gallery of Australia held from 2020